Polylopha is a genus of moths belonging to the family Tortricidae.

Species
Polylopha cassiicola Liu & Kawabe, 1993
Polylopha epidesma  Lower, 1901
Polylopha hypophaea  Diakonoff, 1974
Polylopha oachranta  Diakonoff, 1974
Polylopha ornithopora  Diakonoff, 1953
Polylopha phaeolopha  Turner, 1925 
Polylopha sichnostola  Diakonoff, 1984

References

 , 2005: World Catalogue of Insects volume 5 Tortricidae.
 , 1993: A new species of the genus Polylopha injurious to cinnamon in China.(Lepidoptera: Chlidanotinae: Polyorthini). Japan Heterocerists' Journal 173: 404-406. Full article: .

External links
tortricidae.com

Polyorthini
Tortricidae genera